Sharon is a city in Steele County, North Dakota, United States. The population was 86 at the 2020 census. Sharon was founded in 1896.

Geography
Sharon is located at  (47.598567, -97.896073).

Demographics

2010 census
As of the census of 2010, there were 96 people, 46 households, and 29 families residing in the city. The racial makeup of the city was 93.8% White and 6.3% Native American.

There were 46 households, of which 26.1% had children under the age of 18 living with them, 50.0% were married couples living together, 10.9% had a female householder with no husband present, 2.2% had a male householder with no wife present, and 37.0% were non-families. 37.0% of all households were made up of individuals, and 19.5% had someone living alone who was 65 years of age or older. The average household size was 2.09 and the average family size was 2.69.

The median age in the city was 52.5 years. 25% of residents were under the age of 18; 2.2% were between the ages of 18 and 24; 14.6% were from 25 to 44; 31.3% were from 45 to 64; and 27.1% were 65 years of age or older. The gender makeup of the city was 52.1% male and 47.9% female.

2000 census
As of the census of 2000, there were 109 people, 57 households, and 29 families residing in the city. The population density was 70.6 people per square mile (27.3/km). There were 76 housing units at an average density of 49.3 per square mile (19.1/km). The racial makeup of the city was 94.50% White, 1.83% Native American, and 3.67% from two or more races.

There were 57 households, out of which 15.8% had children under the age of 18 living with them, 50.9% were married couples living together, 1.8% had a female householder with no husband present, and 47.4% were non-families. 45.6% of all households were made up of individuals, and 22.8% had someone living alone who was 65 years of age or older. The average household size was 1.91 and the average family size was 2.70.

In the city, the population was spread out, with 16.5% under the age of 18, 5.5% from 18 to 24, 15.6% from 25 to 44, 33.0% from 45 to 64, and 29.4% who were 65 years of age or older. The median age was 51 years. For every 100 females, there were 127.1 males. For every 100 females age 18 and over, there were 127.5 males.

The median income for a household in the city was $24,583, and the median income for a family was $43,125. Males had a median income of $27,500 versus $18,750 for females. The per capita income for the city was $19,818. There were no families and 7.4% of the population living below the poverty line, including none under 18 and 4.5% of those over 64.

Notable person

 Hjalmar Carl Nygaard, U.S. Representative, born on nearby farm

Climate
This climatic region is typified by large seasonal temperature differences, with warm to hot (and often humid) summers and cold (sometimes severely cold) winters.  According to the Köppen Climate Classification system, Sharon has a humid continental climate, abbreviated "Dfb" on climate maps.

References

Cities in Steele County, North Dakota
Cities in North Dakota
Populated places established in 1896